Pellam Pichodu ( Crazy of Wife) is a 2005 Telugu-language comedy film, produced by Rampalli Ramabhadra Sastry, Venkata Srinivas Boggaram on banner and directed by Jonnavithhula Ramalingeswara Rao. Starring Rajendra Prasad, Richa, Srujana and music also composed by Rajendra Prasad.

Plot
Srinivas / Srinu (Rajendra Prasad) who falls in love with Madhavi (Srujana), he takes the help of a friend (Shiva Reddy) who impresses Madhavi by telling all lies about Srinu. Srinu finally succeeds in marrying Madhavi. He loves his wife madly, every waking moment he does things to please his wife. There is bliss in marriage and they shift into a new house where their neighbors Murali Krishna (Dharmavarapu Subramanyam), Raghu (Raghu Babu), Kitta Govindam (Satyam Rajesh) are wayward husbands feel jealous of Srinu & Madhavi. Srinu is very independent-minded, though he works in a chit fund company, he opens his own agency. He lies to his wife that he is a partner in the chit fund company where he works as a clerk and doesn't inform her about the running of the agency independently.

Srinu is hopeful that in six months he will be able to quit his job and operate his agency in a full-fledged manner and he collapsed into a lot of debts. He is prepared, to tell the truth to his wife then, but before that the lies are exposed there the first crack in a fully functional marriage appears. Priya (Richa) his childhood close friend enters into his life who helps him in his problems both of starts up a business which becomes most successful and Srinu comes out from his problems but Madhavi doubts on Srinu increases day by day and the crack deepens, ultimately the relationship breaks. The climax of the movie brings the doting husband back to his wife.

Cast

Rajendra Prasad as Srinivas / Srinu
Richa as Priya
Srujana as Madhavi
Dharmavarapu Subramanyam as Murali Krishna
Giri Babu as
Raghu Babu as Raghu
Surya
Satyam Rajesh as Kitta Govindam
Siva Reddy
Ramana Murthy 
Vizag Prasad
Ananth
KK Sarma
Shankar Melkote
Gundu Sudarshan
Junior Relangi
Annapurna
Telangana Sakunthala
Hema
Rajitha
Surekha Vani
Jyothi
Anitha Chowdary
Padma Jayanthi

Soundtrack

Music composed by Rajendra Prasad. Lyrics were written by Jonnavithhula Ramalingeswara Rao. Music released on Music Company.

Awards
Nandi Awards - 2005
Best Popular Feature Film - Gold - Rampalli Ramabhadra  Sastry 
Best Male Playback Singer - S. P. Balasubrahmanyam

References

Indian comedy films
2005 comedy films
2005 films
2000s Telugu-language films